Babu Rajendra Prasad Bhaskar (born March 12, 1932) is a journalist and human rights-social activist from Kerala.

Journalism career
Bhaskar served as editor of many of India's leading national newspapers. Co-Editor of The Hindu in Chennai (1953-1958), Deputy Editor at The Statesman in New Delhi (1959-1963), Co-Editor of Patriot from 1963 to 1965, worked in UNI from 1965 to 1983.Associate Editor at Deccan Herald in Bangalore from 1984 to 91 From 1996 to 1997, he served as director and consultant of Andrapradesh Times in Hyderabad.
BRP is a columnist for the Gulf Today newspaper, which is published from Sharjah. Also written in various newspapers in Malayalam and English.

References

1932 births
Living people
Malayalam-language journalists
Malayali people
Indian editors
Journalists from Kerala
20th-century Indian journalists
Indian male journalists